Natsukashii Mirai (懐かしい未来) is Akino Arai's first release.

Track listing
"Ring Ring"
"月よ凍れ"     (Tsuki yo Kōre)
"金色の目"     (Kiniro no Me, Golden Eyes)
"地図をゆく雲"     (Chizu wo Yuku Kumo)
"美しい星"     (Utsukushii Hoshi, Beautiful Star)
"1999"
"約束"     (Yakusoku, Promise)
"ロゼ"・ルージュ     (Roze Rūju, ROSE ROUGE)
"Sky Lounge"

Akino Arai albums
1986 albums
Victor Entertainment albums